Jack Parker (28 March 1911 – 10 December 2003) was an Australian rules footballer who played with North Melbourne in the Victorian Football League (VFL).

Parker later served in the Australian Army during World War II.

Notes

External links 

1911 births
2003 deaths
Australian rules footballers from Victoria (Australia)
North Melbourne Football Club players